Purushottama Bilimoria is an Australian-American philosopher and scholar of Indian origin. 

He studied at the University of Auckland (BA) and the University of Otago (PGDiplArts), in New Zealand, and received his PhD in 1983 from La Trobe University in Australia. He is a former Fellow of All Souls College, University of Oxford (under Prof Bimal Matilal). Currently, he is appointed Head of Purushottama Research Center for Philosophy and Culture of India, and Scholar at the Peoples' Friendship University of Russia, Moscow, Russia. He is also Principal Fellow with the School of Philosophical and Historical Studies and senior research fellow with the Australia India Institute resigned March 2022, both in the University of Melbourne, Australia. 

Among his recent academic positions are: Fulbright-Nehru Distinguished Fellow and Visiting Faculty at Ashoka University in Delhi, India (Fall 2019); permanent senior fellow with the Oxford Centre for Hindu Studies, The University of Oxford; distinguished teaching and senior research fellow in Indian philosophy and formerly core doctoral faculty at Graduate Theological Union in Berkeley; Chancellor's Scholar, lecturer and visiting professor at the University of California, Berkeley; visiting scholar with the Institute for South Asia Studies, University of California at Berkeley]]; and honorary professor at the Deakin University.  Visiting Scholar Faculty of Philosophy, Ljubljana University (Program in Indian Philosophy & Indology), and Koç University  (Istanbul).

A co-founder of the Australian Society for Asian and Comparative Philosophy., he is also Co-Editor-in-Chief of both 'Sophia'(international journal in Philosophy and Traditions, with Springer, based in University of Melbourne) and 'Journal of Dharma Studies' (Springer), and Editor (with Amy Rayner) of Routledge History of Indian Philosophy (2018). He is also founder and the co-editor-in-chief of the Sophia Studies in Cross-Cultural Philosophy of Traditions and Culture (currently at 30 volumes; with Springer).

Selected works
 Sustainability Interdisciplinary and Interreligious Approaches (co-edited with Rita Sherma, Springer 2021)
 Contemplative Studies and Hinduism (co-edited with Rita Sherma, Routkedge 2020)
 Routledge History of Indian Philosophy (2018)
 Sabda Pramana: Word and Knowledge/Testimony in Indian Philosophy (Springer 1988; Delhi 2008)
 Why is there Nothing Rather than Something? (Sophia (2013)
 The Indian Diaspora The Hindus and Sikhs in Australia (1996; 2015)
 The Self & its Other in Hindu Thought (2005)
 Contemporary Philosophy and J.L. Shaw (ed.) (2006)
 Essays in Indian Philosophy: Traditional and Modern (1995) (with J. Mohanty)
 The Other Revolution: NGO and Feminist Perspectives from South and East Asia (1998) (with R. Sharma).
 "Emotions in Indian-Thought System" (2015 with Aleksander Wenta)
 "Postcolonial Philosophy of Philosophy" (2009 with Andrew Irvine)
 "J L Shaw and Comparative Philosophy" (with Michael Hemmingsen, 2016)
 "Indian Ethics vol I Classical and Contemporary Changes (with J Prabhu and Renuka Sharma 2017 Routledge Paperback)
 " Indian Ethics vol II Gender Justice and Ecology (with Prabhu, Sharma and Amy Rayner) (Springer 2018)
 "Preface to Empathy Theory and Practice in Psychotheraphy by Renuka Sharma" (2014)
 "Globalization, Transnationalism, Gender and Ecological Engagement" (with Amy Rayner, 2012)

References

External links

https://www.springer.com/journal/11841
https://blogs.unimelb.edu.au/shaps-research/2019/01/01/sophia/
https://www.aii.unimelb.edu.au/about/aii-fellows/
 Oxford Centre for Hindu Studies profile
 Berkeley Blog profile
 Personal website

Living people
Academic staff of the University of Melbourne
Year of birth missing (living people)